Congress Hall may refer to:
 Congress Hall, a former United States capitol building
 Congress Hall (Cape May hotel), a historic hotel in Cape May, Cape May County, New Jersey, United States
 Congress Hall (Paramaribo), a convention and exhibition centre in Paramaribo, Suriname
 Congress Hall, Ufa, a Government House in Ufa, Bashkortostan, Russia
 Congress Hall (Warsaw), a theatre at the Palace of Culture and Science in Warsaw, Poland
 April 25 House of Culture, a theatre located in Pyongyang, North Korea, sometimes referred to as Congress Hall